Caïman Fu are a Québécois pop rock band founded in 2000 by Nicolas Grimard and Yves Manseau.  They released their self-titled debut album in 2003, which was subsequently followed by Les Charmes du Quotidien ("the charms of the everyday") in fall 2005 and Drôle d'animal in 2008.

In 2005 they were spokespersons for the first Salon of independent music of Quebec. They played at Francofolies in 2002 and 2003.

Discography 
 2003  : Caïman Fu
 2006 : Les charmes du quotidien
 2008  : Drôle d'animal
 2012  : À des milles

Band members

Line-up

Anecdotes 
 The name of their group is often stylized with an "ï" that includes two dots placed vertically and not horizontally.

References

Canadian indie rock groups
Musical groups from Montreal
Musical groups established in 2003
2003 establishments in Quebec